The Imereti Lowlands is located in western Georgia (country) and continues on the coast of the Black Sea between the Mzymta and Psou rivers in the Krasnodar Krai, Russia. It meets the sea in the Adler district of Sochi city.

The name derives from the Georgian region of Imereti.

The Imereti Lowlands was an important bird area protected since 1911, most of which was destroyed during the construction of the Coastal cluster of the 2014 Winter Olympic Games. The project included hotel complexes that would have a combined total of 5,600 rooms. The largest of these hotels was built on 36 hectares in the Imereti Lowlands. The Lowlands would also have a four-star, 700-room hotel for dignitaries and guests attending the Games.

An ornithological park was officially created on 298,59 ha of lands left unoccupied by the olympic infrastructure, but mostly inadequate for the park purpose.

References
 www.ikd.ru — Жителям имеретинской низменности пообещали, что переселения не будет
 www.seu.ru — Строительство Олимпийских объектов окончательно погубит Имеретинскую низменность
 bp21.org.by — Реквием по Имеретинской низменности
 http://geo.opensochi.org - Природный орнитологический парк в Имеретинской низменности

Sochi
Landforms of Krasnodar Krai
Valleys of Russia